In geometry, a 6-orthoplex, or 6-cross polytope, is a regular 6-polytope with 12 vertices, 60 edges, 160 triangle faces, 240 tetrahedron cells, 192 5-cell 4-faces, and 64 5-faces.

It has two constructed forms, the first being regular with Schläfli symbol {34,4}, and the second with alternately labeled (checkerboarded) facets, with Schläfli symbol {3,3,3,31,1} or Coxeter symbol 311.

It is a part of an infinite family of polytopes, called cross-polytopes or orthoplexes. The dual polytope is the 6-hypercube, or hexeract.

Alternate names
Hexacross, derived from combining the family name cross polytope with hex for six (dimensions) in Greek. 
 Hexacontitetrapeton as a 64-facetted 6-polytope.

As a configuration
This configuration matrix represents the 6-orthoplex. The rows and columns correspond to vertices, edges, faces, cells, 4-faces and 5-faces. The diagonal numbers say how many of each element occur in the whole 6-orthoplex. The nondiagonal numbers say how many of the column's element occur in or at the row's element.

Construction 

There are three Coxeter groups associated with the 6-orthoplex, one regular, dual of the hexeract with the C6 or [4,3,3,3,3] Coxeter group, and a half symmetry with two copies of 5-simplex facets, alternating, with the D6 or [33,1,1] Coxeter group. A lowest symmetry construction is based on a dual of a 6-orthotope, called a 6-fusil.

Cartesian coordinates 
Cartesian coordinates for the vertices of a 6-orthoplex, centered at the origin are
 (±1,0,0,0,0,0), (0,±1,0,0,0,0), (0,0,±1,0,0,0), (0,0,0,±1,0,0), (0,0,0,0,±1,0), (0,0,0,0,0,±1)

Every vertex pair is connected by an edge, except opposites.

Images

Related polytopes
The 6-orthoplex can be projected down to 3-dimensions into the vertices of a regular icosahedron.

It is in a dimensional series of uniform polytopes and honeycombs, expressed by Coxeter as 3k1 series. (A degenerate 4-dimensional case exists as 3-sphere tiling, a tetrahedral hosohedron.)

This polytope is one of 63 uniform 6-polytopes generated from the B6 Coxeter plane, including the regular 6-cube or 6-orthoplex.

References
 H.S.M. Coxeter: 
 H.S.M. Coxeter, Regular Polytopes, 3rd Edition, Dover New York, 1973 
 Kaleidoscopes: Selected Writings of H.S.M. Coxeter, edited by F. Arthur Sherk, Peter McMullen, Anthony C. Thompson, Asia Ivic Weiss, Wiley-Interscience Publication, 1995,  
 (Paper 22) H.S.M. Coxeter, Regular and Semi Regular Polytopes I, [Math. Zeit. 46 (1940) 380-407, MR 2,10]
 (Paper 23) H.S.M. Coxeter, Regular and Semi-Regular Polytopes II, [Math. Zeit. 188 (1985) 559-591]
 (Paper 24) H.S.M. Coxeter, Regular and Semi-Regular Polytopes III, [Math. Zeit. 200 (1988) 3-45]
 Norman Johnson Uniform Polytopes, Manuscript (1991)
 N.W. Johnson: The Theory of Uniform Polytopes and Honeycombs, Ph.D. 1966
 

Specific

External links 

 Polytopes of Various Dimensions
 Multi-dimensional Glossary

6-polytopes